Kassinula is a genus of frogs in the family Hyperoliidae. It is monotypic, being represented by the single species, Kassinula wittei. It is found in Democratic Republic of the Congo, Zambia, and possibly Angola.
Its natural habitats are moist savanna, subtropical or tropical seasonally wet or flooded lowland grassland, intermittent freshwater lakes, and intermittent freshwater marshes.

References

Hyperoliidae
Monotypic amphibian genera
Amphibians described in 1940
Taxa named by Raymond Laurent
Taxonomy articles created by Polbot